Information diving is the practice of recovering technical data, sometimes confidential or secret, from discarded material. In recent times, this has chiefly been from data storage elements in discarded computers, most notably recoverable data remaining on hard drives. Those in charge of discarding computers usually neglect to erase the hard drive. It is often in such circumstances for an information diver to copy installed software (e.g., word processors,  operating systems, computer games, etc.). Other data may also be available, such as credit card information that was stored on the machine. Companies claim to be especially careful with customer data, but the number of data breaches by any type of entity (e.g., education, health care, insurance, government, ...) suggest otherwise. In the UK, information diving has been referred to as "binology."

Today, files, letters, memos, photographs, IDs, passwords, credit cards, and more can be found in dumpsters. Many people do not consider that sensitive information on items they discarded may be recovered. Such information, when recovered, is sometimes usable for fraudulent purposes (see also "identity theft" and physical information security). This method of dumpster diving is also sometimes used by attorneys or their agents when seeking to enforce court-ordered money judgments: the judgment debtor's trash may contain information about assets that can then be more-readily located for levying.

Supposedly, information diving was more common in the 1980s due to lax security; when businesses became aware of the need for increased security in the early 1990s, sensitive documents were shredded before being placed in dumpsters. There is still considerable Internet activity on the subject of dumpster diving, so it is unlikely to have stopped with the widespread introduction of document shredding. Security mythology has it that curious hackers or malicious crackers commonly use this technique.

Cases

Printed manuals 
In earlier times, the available discarded data included printed manuals and design records. In a famous case, a student, Jerry Schneider, discovered some discarded manuals for a telephone system ordering/shipping system and was able to build a business selling 'surplus' gear ordered from the telephone company as though it was for an internal company department.

Discarded computers 
Two MIT students purchased a large number of obsolete computers at yard sales, and they were able to obtain information such as credit card information and tax return data. They published a paper, Remembrance of Things Past, documenting their discoveries.

Dumpster diving 
Dumpster diving is commonly practiced by "watchdog" organizations seeking information on groups they are investigating.  The Trinity Foundation successfully used this technique to report on the activities of televangelist Robert Tilton and was also able to obtain information on Benny Hinn.

See also
Dumpster diving
E-waste
Credit card fraud
Copyright infringement of software
Benjamin Pell

References

Security
Carding (fraud)
Data security